Aung Zaw, ( 1968), is a Burmese journalist, editor, and founder of major publishing  media The Irrawaddy. He was jailed and tortured at the age of 20, then covertly escaped his home country after he began protesting the governments socialist military regime during the 8888 Uprising. His news magazine reported on event later during the Saffron Revolution.

Personal
Aung Zaw studied Botany at Yangon University in Rangoon, Burma (now Yangon, Myanmar). In 1988, at the age of 20, he was arrested at the Hlaing Campus of Yangon University during a student rally to protest the socialist regime of Ne Win. He was then detained for 10 days in the Insein prison. Before leaving his home country, he was a part of the Insein Literary Circle (အင်းစိန်စာပေဝိုင်း) Aung Zaw fled to Bangkok, Thailand where he would start The Irrawaddy, a news publication named after Myanmar's largest river. The publication later moved to Chiang Mai in 1995–96.

Career
Aung Zaw, founder and editor of The Irrawaddy, began publication of the news magazine, and formed the Burma Information Group, in exile from Thailand in 1993. He operated out of Thailand for nearly two decades before being invited to return to Myanmar in 2012. Aung Zaw took The Irrawaddy online in 2001, but it was not readily available to Myanmar readers until 2011 due to online censorship. In 2014, The Irrawaddy launched its first printed publication in Myanmar. The printed publication was short lived and last printed in January 2016.

Notable works of journalism
After leaving Myanmar disguised as a monk, Aung Zaw fled to Bangkok where he started the Burma Information Group (BIG). Shortly after, he would start The Irrawaddy. In 2012, the online news magazine was granted access back into Myanmar. Still under government restrictions, he said, "Since we're back in Burma our reports remain very strong. We focus on land confiscations, corruption, scandals, as well as ethnic and religious conflicts in our country." In addition to running The Irrawaddy, he is also a contributor for The New York Times, International Herald Tribune, The Guardian (UK), and The Bangkok Post.

Context
At the age of 25, Aung Zaw launched The Irrawaddy, in efforts to cover Burma affairs, in the South East Asian Countries. Aung Zaw's arrests were part of the military regimes attempt to silence the spread of information. The publication was targeted by hackers in 2008, 2010–2011.

Impact
Aung Zaw notes the impact The Irrawaddy carries in the coverings of the Saffron Revolution. The Irrawaddy was receiving real time updates and publishing them online to shed light to the otherwise unnoticed protest. The Burmese government had a history of jailing and torturing journalist in attempts to silence them.

Throughout constant oppression, Aung Zaw has kept his finger on the political and social pulse of Myanmar. He was labeled an "Enemy of The State" by former military regimes.

Awards
Aung Zaw was the 2010 recipient of the Prince Claus Award, the 2013 Shorenstein Journalism Award, and the 2014 CPJ International Press Freedom Award.

See also
 Human rights in Myanmar
 Internet censorship in Myanmar
 Media of Myanmar

References

External links 
 Aung Zaw 2014 IPFA Acceptance Speech
 Bertil Lintner on Myanmar's Peace Process

1968 births
Living people
Burmese democracy activists
Burmese journalists